Listen, Learn, Read On is a box set released by the British hard rock band Deep Purple in 2002.

It is a collection of 74 tracks distributed in six CDs, around a quarter of which were unreleased prior to the album; all the tracks were subject to extensive re-mastering at EMI's Abbey Road Studios. The set starts with a selection of early tracks by the members of the band before they joined Deep Purple.

The box set also houses a format book written by Deep Purple archivist Simon Robinson, which tells the band's story via 120 pages of text, pictures, cuttings, memorabilia, musician profiles and discographies.

Listen, Learn, Read On has been deleted from EMI's catalogue and is no longer in production.

Release and reception

Dave Thompson of AllMusic writes  Amid the ever-growing tide of Deep Purple box sets (this was at least their eighth in nine years), Listen Learn Read On stands alone, not only as the ultimate round-up of the band's greatest moments, but also as the answer to more collectors' dreams than most collectors were even aware they'd had. You want Deep Purple's long-legendary, but forever unavailable BBC sessions? They're here. You want the killer live encores that other albums omitted? They're here. You want a solid introduction to the band members' pre-Purple passages? They're here. And, of course, you want the hits.

This monster set is certainly the most luxurious collection on the band ever issued, and was twice runner up in 'best box set' category in Record Collector's annual poll.

Track listing
All songs written by Ritchie Blackmore, Ian Gillan, Roger Glover, Jon Lord and Ian Paice except where indicated.

Disc one: Pre Purple and Mk 1
 "Keep a Knockin'" (Penniman) 2:34
 The Outlaws [feat. Ritchie Blackmore]
 "You'll Never Stop Me Loving You" (Roger Lewis) 3:28
 M.I. Five [feat. Rod Evans, Ian Paice]'
 "Only Time Will Tell" (Lewis) 2:11
 M.I. Five [feat. Evans, Paice]
 "Send for That Girl" (Rowland Barter) 2:42
 Johnny Kidd & the Pirates [feat. Nick Simper]
 "Porcupine Juice" (Gus Dudgeon/Lord) 3:13
 Santa Barbara Machine Head [feat. Jon Lord]
 "I Can See Through You" (Roger Glover) 3:23
 Episode Six [feat. Ian Gillan, Roger Glover]
 "Mr. Universe" (Hal David/Gillan) 4:17
 Episode Six [feat. Gillan, Glover]
 "Medusa" (Hughes) 5:40
 Trapeze [feat. Glenn Hughes]
 "Does Anybody Really Know What Time It Is?" (Robert Lamm) 3:17
 The Government [feat. David Coverdale]
 "See My People Come Together" (Bolin) 6:07
 Zephyr [feat. Tommy Bolin]
 "Hush" (South) 4:13
 "Help" (Lennon–McCartney) 6:00
 "Shield" (Lord/Blackmore/Evans) 6:01
 "Listen, Learn, Read On" (Blackmore/Lord/Evans/Paice) 4:00
 "Kentucky Woman" (Neil Diamond) 4:41
 "Playground" (Blackmore/Lord/Simper/Paice) 4:31 (The Book of Taliesyn out-take)
 "Emmaretta" (Blackmore/Lord/Evans) 2:58 (single A-side)
 "The Bird Has Flown" (Blackmore/Lord/Evans) 2:51 (US single B-side)

Disc two: Mk 1 and Mk 2
 "Why Didn't Rosemary?" (Blackmore/Lord/Evans/Simper/Paice) 5:02
 "Hallelujah" (Greenaway/Cook) 3:40 (single A-side)
 "Ricochet" 3:04 (BBC session 11 Aug 1969)
 "The Bird Has Flown" (Blackmore/Lord/Evans) 3:03 (BBC session)
 "Hush" (South) 4:16 (Live, Royal Albert Hall, 24 Sep 1969)
 "Concerto Third Movement reprise" (Lord) 5:36 (Live, Royal Albert Hall)
 "Wring That Neck" (Lord/Blackmore/Simper/Paice) 20:43 (Live, Montreux Casino, 4 Oct 1969)
 "Jam Stew" 3:54 (BBC session 31 Oct 1969)
 "Speed King" 3:23 (BBC session)
 "Cry Free" 3:08 (Deep Purple in Rock out-take)
 "Hard Lovin' Man" 4:12 (BBC session 21 Apr 1970)
 "Bloodsucker"  3:14 (BBC session)
 "Living Wreck" 2:58 (BBC session)
 "Studio Chat / Jam" 0:40
 "Flight of the Rat" 7:53 (95 remix)

Disc three: Mk 2
 "Mandrake Root" (Blackmore/Evans) 30:02 (Live, Stockholm, 12 Nov 1970)
 "Grabsplatter" 4:30 (BBC session 23 Sep 1970)
 "Child in Time" 10:47 (BBC session)
 "Jon Lord Interview" 1:35
 "Black Night" 3:28 (BBC session)
 "Into the Fire" 3:48 (BBC session)
 "Fools" 5:19
 "Fireball" 3:23
 "No One Came" 6:24
 "Demon's Eye" 6:08 (96 remix)

Disc four: Mk 2 and Mk 3
 "No No No" 7:16 (Live, Beat Club, German TV Sep 1971)
 "Highway Star" 6:08 (Live, Beat Club)
 "Smoke on the Water" 5:49 (Quad Mix UK 1974)
 "Never Before" 4:01 (Quad Mix)
 "When a Blind Man Cries" 3:27 (97 remix)
 "Strange Kind of Woman" 8:44 (BBC in Concert, Paris Theatre 9 Mar 1972)
 "Lazy" 11:13 (Live, Tokyo, 17 Aug 1972)
 "Black Night" 5:47 (Live, Osaka, 16 Aug 1972)
 "Woman from Tokyo" 6:24 (99 remix)
 "Smooth Dancer" 4:08
 "Mary Long" 4:26 (99 remix)
 "Burn" (Blackmore/Lord/Paice/Coverdale) 6:00
 "Might Just Take Your Life" (Blackmore/Lord/Paice/Coverdale) 4:36

Disc five: Mk 3
 "Sail Away" (Blackmore/Coverdale) 5:47
 "Coronarias Redig" (Blackmore/Lord/Paice) 4:52 (single B-side)
 "You Fool No One" (Blackmore/Lord/Paice/Coverdale) 18:58 (Live, Ontario Speedway, 6 Apr 1974)
 "Mistreated" (Blackmore/Coverdale) 12:02 (Live, San Diego Sports Arena, 9 Apr 1974)
 "Space Truckin'" 29:52 (Live, Kilburn Gaumont, 22 May 1974)

Disc six: Mk 3 and Mk 4 
 "Stormbringer" (Blackmore/Coverdale) 4:04 (Quad Mix)
 "Soldier of Fortune" (Blackmore/Coverdale) 3:14 (Quad Mix)
 "Hold On" (Coverdale/Hughes/Lord/Paice) 5:08 (Quad Mix)
 "High Ball Shooter" (Blackmore/Coverdale/Hughes/Lord/Paice) 4:30 (Instrumental mix)
 "The Gypsy" (Blackmore/Coverdale/Hughes/Lord/Paice) 5:43 (Live, Paris Palais des Sports, 7 Apr 1975)
 "Drifter" (Bolin/Coverdale) 3:58 (California live rehearsal, June 1975)
 "Dance to the Rock 'n' Roll" (Bolin/Coverdale/Hughes/Lord/Paice) 10:59 (California live rehearsal, Jam)
 "This Time Around/Owed to 'G'" (Hughes/Lord; Bolin) 6:06
 "Love Child" (Bolin/Coverdale) 3:03
 "Wild Dogs" (Bolin/Tesar) 5:54 (Live, Tokyo Budokan, 15 Dec 1975)
 "Lady Luck" (Cook/Coverdale) 3:24 (Live, Long Beach Arena, 27 Feb 1976)
 "Gettin' Tighter" (Bolin/Hughes) 13:18 (Live, Long Beach Arena)
 "You Keep on Moving" (Coverdale/Hughes) 5:18

Personnel
Mk 1: 1968-1969 – Ritchie Blackmore, Rod Evans, Jon Lord, Ian Paice, Nick Simper
Mk 2: 1969-1973 – Ritchie Blackmore, Ian Gillan, Roger Glover, Jon Lord, Ian Paice
Mk 3: 1973-1975 – Ritchie Blackmore, David Coverdale, Glenn Hughes, Jon Lord, Ian Paice
Mk 4: 1975-1976 – Tommy Bolin, David Coverdale, Glenn Hughes, Jon Lord, Ian Paice

References

External links 
 Listen, Learn, Read on the Original Official Deep Purple Webpages

Albums produced by Derek Lawrence
Albums produced by Martin Birch
2002 compilation albums
Deep Purple compilation albums
EMI Records compilation albums